Lakshyabhed (The Target) is a 2009 Bengali film directed by Raj Mukherjee. The film stars Joy, Swastika Mukherjee, Rachana Banerjee, Tapas Paul, Sabyasachi, Monoj Mitra, Kharaj Mukherjee, Locket, Pulokita, Neel, Kanchan Mullick, and Monu Mukherjee. It was shot at Pattaya in Thailand, a first for a Bengali film. An 18-member team camped in Pattaya to shoot the sun and sand. and Eden Gardens, Kolkata.

Plot
The film is about Rupak Chowdhury and his mentally retarded brother Joy along with their step brother Rohit and sister Rinki. They live with their step uncle Ahi mama and his wife, who conspire against them. Joy was given poisonous medicines since his childhood by Ahimama and his Dr. friend which has damaged his nervous system. Nobody loves Joy without Rupak and their servant Harikaka. For a change Rupak takes Joy to their village where they meet two sisters Mukul and Bakul. Incidentally Rupak marries Mukul but when they return to home, the bad guys deny to accept her as Rupak's wife and continuously blame her for their sudden misfortune. Mukul leaves home with Joy to cure him. After consulting a doctor she sends Joy to "Ananda Ashram" under the supervision of Maharaj. On the other hand, Ahimama sends his friend's daughter Kitty to woo Rohit but when Kitty discovers their conspiracy they kill her. Slowly Rinki and Rohit understand that they are being misguided by their beloved uncle and aunt, but it is too late. Ahimama kidnaps Rupak and Mukul- Bakul's parents and kills Harikaka. So Mukkul Bakul and Joy come to rescue Rupak, fight bravely but Rupak and Rohit both die while fighting. Joy kills his Ahimama, takes his revenge, then goes to jail, writes his autobiography "Lakshyabhed" in jail and then is released from jail to live happily ever after with his family.

Cast
 Joy
 Swastika Mukherjee
 Rachana Banerjee
 Tapas Paul
 Sabyasachi Chakraborty
 Manoj Mitra
 Kharaj Mukherjee
 Locket Chatterjee
 Pulokita
 Neel Mukherjee
 Kanchan Mullick
 Monu Mukhopadhyay

Crew
 Story: Sabyasachi
 Directed by: Raj Mukherjee
 Music: Kalyan Sen Barat
 Produced by: D.M Productions
 Executive Producers: Sujay Mukherjee, Sikha Mukherjee
 Art Director: Samir Kumdu
 Cinematography: Bakul Roy
 Screenplay: Sadhan Pal

References

External links
Official Website
  www.telegraphindia.com preview

2009 films
Bengali-language Indian films
Films shot in Kolkata
2000s Bengali-language films